Day Alone is the fifth studio album by Japanese J-pop band Day After Tomorrow.

Track listing

References

2005 albums
Avex Group albums
Day After Tomorrow (band) albums